Kendal Park or Hullbridge Foreshore is a 2.8 hectare Local Nature Reserve in Hullbridge in Essex. It is owned by Rochford District Council and managed by Hullbridge Parish Council.

The site has a wildflower meadow, coppiced woodland, grassland and a pond. Flowers in the meadow include hoary cress, charlock and ox-eye daisy, and there are many species of butterflies. The woodland has birds such as dunnock and song thrushes.

There is access from Ferry Road.

References

Local Nature Reserves in Essex